The Fifteenth Legislative Assembly of Madhya Pradesh constituted after the 2018 Madhya Pradesh Legislative Assembly elections which were concluded on November 2018, with the results being declared on 11 December 2018. The tenure of 14th Madhya Pradesh Assembly ended on 5 January 2019.

Members of Legislative Assembly

References

 
Madhya Pradesh